Jim Norman (born David Philip James Norman IV, October 29, 1948) is a convicted fraudster serving a 20 year sentence in Federal prison. He was a Canadian percussionist, drummer, producer and composer based in Toronto, who is best known for his work in the fields of jazz, New Age trance and improvisation and later his participation in a multi-million dollar international advance fee confidence scam. He was convicted for conspiracy to commit wire fraud through his ESPAVO Foundation and Thrum Records. He is currently serving the sentence in the  FCI Big Spring, Texas under the BOP.gov Register Number: 65940-054.

Early life
Born in Montreal, Quebec, Norman is the son of a doctor and a historian/political activist. His interest in drumming came from his grandmother, who was also an academic, played drums in Greenwich Village in the 1940s and studied with the legendary jazz drummer Cozy Cole. Living in Jamaica and the West Indies as a boy, he studied classical guitar at the Foster Davis School of Music. He returned to North America in the 1960s, studying briefly at Alfred State University in upper N.Y. State, then Sir George Williams University in Montreal. He began his career in the arts in 1967.

Advance fee confidence scam and wire fraud
More recently, Norman has used his "celebrity" status to become involved in putting together an investment group under the name ESPAVO Group and Thrum Records  through which he personally promised enormous returns on victims' money for aiding in supposedly freeing Foundation money that was being illegally held via patriot act restrictions. The fraud was carried out with accomplices: Trevor D. James, Sr., age 38, of Lawrenceville, Georgia; Laure Huff, age unknown, of North Carolina; Beryl Koenig, age 58, of Brighton, Colorado; and Clifford Michael Emery, age unknown, of London, England. Victims invested millions in this scheme and as a result of his investment fraud he was indicted by the state of South Carolina.

A letter from Norman shows how he positioned his operation:
I Jim Norman am telling you this….17 mill 12 mill and 68 mill PLUS interest, totaling over 168 million, as stated by the TREASURY DEPARTMENT OF THE UNITED STATES IN MY DEFENCE OF AN EX EMPLOYEE ATTEMPTING TO CLAIM BENIFICIARY STATUS, AFFECTIING OVER 300 PEOPLE THAT HAVE WORKED WITH ME FOR FOUR YEARS TO GET MY MONEY INTO THIS POWERFUL BANKING SYSTEM IN GENEVA, AND 220 MILLION FOR THEIR RETURN, AND HOLDING UP BROKERS FOR THE PAST YEAR FROM MAKING ME OVER 135% DAILY ON JUST 100 MILLION OF THIS MONEY, (THAT IS, I CAN MAKE OVER 100 MILL DAILEY understand?).WITH GENEVA ON STANDBY WAITING NOT ONLY FOR MYSELF MYACCOUNTATN AND WILL MY ATTORNY TO GO TO GENEVA TO RECEIVE AN AWARD FOR MY COMPANY IN THE FORM OF A PLAQUE, BUT ALSO THAT I AM TO BE GIVEN A "BANKING LISCENCE" SO THAT I WILL BECOME "BANQUE DU ESPAVO" THAT THEN FEEDS "THE ESPAVO FOUNDATION", THAT THEN FEED "THRUM RECORDS".

During his trial, Manhattan U.S. Attorney Preet Bharara said: "By promising huge returns on their investments, Jim Norman induced scores of victims from around the country to give him millions of dollars. As proven at trial, his promise was nothing more than a shameless scheme to steal hard earned money from the victims, some of whom lost their entire life savings and even their homes. With today’s sentence, Norman will pay the price for his fraud and the suffering that he has caused his victims."

FBI Assistant Director in Charge George Venizelos said: "As the jury found, Jim Norman used fast talk and the lure of easy profits to separate credulous investors from their money. The promissory notes he issued were as fraudulent as the rest of his scheme. The immediate results were ill-gotten gains for Norman and devastating losses for his victims. The endgame for Norman is a lengthy prison term."

FBI Court documents state: 
According to the evidence presented at trial, beginning in 2004 through his arrest in Canada in December 2009, Norman told victims that, as part of the "Jim Norman Program," he was seeking investors to help pay fees to secure the release of hundreds of millions of dollars held in bank accounts in Spain and Switzerland. Norman, along with his co-conspirators in the United States who helped lure victims into the scheme, stole at least $7 million from more than 100 victims by promising them huge returns on their investments—that would be paid in a matter of days or weeks at most—and by giving victims official-looking, but worthless, "promissory notes" that purportedly guaranteed their investments and return. In reality, there were no overseas accounts, and Norman and his co-conspirators spent the victims’ money on themselves by making large retail purchases and withdrawing hundreds of thousands of dollars in cash. As a result of the fraudulent scheme perpetrated by Norman, some victims lost all their assets, others lost their homes, and others lost their businesses.

Indictment
Five people were charged in three federal indictments with wire fraud for offering fraudulent investments. The indictments were a result of an ongoing FBI investigation into scams that promote phony investment programs, promising unsuspecting investors large returns on their investments. The defendants are alleged to have sought substantial investments in "note-trading" programs, falsely claiming that the programs existed, the investments were risk-free, and that high yield returns were guaranteed.

Also charged in the case were:
David P.J. (Jim) Norman, age unknown, of Canada
Trevor D. James, Sr., age 38, of Lawrenceville, Georgia
Laure Huff, age unknown, of North Carolina
Beryl Koenig, age 58, of Brighton, Colorado
Clifford Michael Emery, age unknown, of London, England

The maximum penalty each defendant could receive was a fine of $250,000.00 and/or imprisonment of twenty years. This case was investigated by agents of the Federal Bureau of Investigation was assigned to Assistant United States Attorney David C. Stephens of the Greenville Office for prosecution.

Extradition from Canada
Between his arrest on December 7, 2009 in Canada and his eventual extradition to the United States in November 2011, Norman spent a number of years fighting the extradition order while he was held in various Toronto Remand Centres, including the Don Jail and the Toronto West Detention Centre. He later lost his case when the Supreme Court of Canada said in its ruling over "Whether the extradition judge erred by ordering the applicant to be surrendered to the United States of America":
The United States seek Mr. Norman’s extradition in connection with an allegation of fraud against individuals. Mr. Norman, along with other persons, operated a "program" by which he and others solicited "investors" to advance funds in exchange for the promise of significant returns on their investments in a short period of time. Despite the inducement of promised large returns, the investors did not receive any such returns, save with one small exception, or the return of their original investment. Mr. Norman is alleged to have defrauded a number of individuals of hundreds of thousands of dollars, possibly totalling millions of dollars.

On December 7, 2009, Mr. Norman was arrested on a warrant issued pursuant to s. 16 of the Extradition Act. The Ontario Superior Court of Justice ordered his committal, and an appeal and an application for judicial review of that decision were dismissed by the Ontario Court of Appeal.

Conviction
Norman was convicted of on July 12, 2013. The case was handled by the FBI Office’s General Crimes Unit. Assistant United States Attorneys Andrew Goldstein and Andrea Surratt were in charge of the prosecution.

In addition to the prison term, Judge Forrest sentenced Norman, 64, of Toronto, Ontario, Canada, to three years of supervised release. Norman was also ordered to forfeit $2,197,637 and pay $1,731,805 in restitution, in addition to a $100 special assessment fee.

US Court of Appeals Second Circuit Decision
Norman, convicted of conspiracy to commit wire fraud, appealed his sentence based on procedural errors. The court concluded that the district court painstakingly calculated the Guidelines-recommended range of imprisonment, finding that the factual components of its calculations were supported by at least a preponderance of the evidence. The court rejected the defendant's claims of procedural error that the district court improperly calculated his Guidelines offense level by inconsistently crediting parts of his trial testimony and that the district court improperly made findings as to loss amount, number of victims, role, and intent to obstruct justice. Further, the court concluded that Norman's 240-month term of imprisonment was substantively reasonable. Because the court found all of the defendant's claims to be without merit, the court affirmed the judgment.

Musical career
During the 1980s and 1990s, Norman worked with the likes of Paul Shaffer, Carole Pope, Domenic Troiano, Jimmy Smith, Oliver Lake, Salome Bey, Oliver Schroer, and Tiger Okoshi. In addition to performing at New York City's infamous Knitting Factory, a recent concert produced by Thrum Records was aired on Bravo.

Norman is a student of t'ai chi, yoga, reiki, tao, meditation and breathing exercises and incorporates their philosophies into his musical compositions and singular drumming technique, which he refers to as "thrumming".
-"Jazz for me represents an "edge" to an activity, a leading edge in its approach to the current thought, with a definite "off the cuff " in the execution. Thrumming is an approach to the drum machine AND the trap (contraption) set of drums, that calls for "playing" the machine in real time, repeating mistakes and all, while sitting and playing the kit."

Equipment

Norman's instrument is composed of approximately 35 drums, fifteen cymbals, gongs, rain-sticks, chimes, and over 50 other percussion sounds, some acoustic and some electronic. It has been referred to as a monstrous kit.

Reviews
"All 18 compositions were recorded with no overdubbing and 13 of them in single takes. That's quite remarkable considering their complexity. And, Time Changes, Times Change is quite a remarkable album."

"The album (Time Changes, Times Change) seems like an extension of Miles Davis' early electric works, early Weather Report and '70s Euro-fusion from Jan Akkerman and Joachim Kuhn. There are powerful, driving qualities throughout."

Releases
Time Changes, Times Change: Dark Light Music Ltd. (1996)
Improv: Thrum Records (1996)
Beyond the Beginning - Visitor In Time
Jim Norman: Skywalker Vision Quest  DVD
Jim Norman: Grafite live DVD
Jim Norman Improv: XI Rhuthmos  DVD
Jim Norman: Grafite Live

References

External links

 Discography
 ESPAVO Foundation and Thrum Records legal status in Nevada
 Advance Fee Confidence Scam
 Criminal Complaint
 The Canadian Encyclopedia
 Forum Discussion of Case
 Supreme Court of Canada Extradition Case
 Supreme Court of Canada rejects stay of extradition
 FBI New York Field Office case and conviction
 NY Court of Appeals
 US Court of Appeals Second Circuit Decision
 BOP.gov Inmate Locator - Register Number: 65940-054

1948 births
Living people
Canadian jazz drummers
Canadian male drummers
Canadian male jazz musicians
Musicians from Montreal
Canadian percussionists
Fraudsters
Confidence tricksters
Sir George Williams University alumni